Suomen kansan vanhat runot (The Ancient Songs of the Finnish People), or SKVR, is an edition of traditional Finnic-language verse containing around 100,000 different songs, and including the majority of the songs that were the sources of the Kalevala and related poetry. The collection is available, free, online.

Contents

The original fourteen volumes (published in around 32 physical volumes) were published by the Finnish Literature Society from 1908 to 1948. A supplement, containing, among other things, some of the field notes of Cristfried Ganander and Elias Lönnrot, was added in 1997. The supplement also contains poems on highly sexual subjects, such as spells to obtain a sexual partner or to improve sexual performance, which had previously been considered unsuitable for publication. Most of the songs in the collection come from the archives of the Finnish Literature Society, but many come from elsewhere, including archives in other countries.

SKVR includes over 89,000 poetic texts in Kalevala-meter, though it is also rich in prose stories and other poetic forms. It does not include all Finnish folklore; around 60,000 texts, for example, are held in unpublished form by the Finnish Literature Society. 

The songs in SKVR are organised into fourteen regions from which they were collected; most volumes then arrange the material by geographical location within the region, and then into four genres:
 lyric songs
 epic or narrative songs
 occasional songs (in genres such as wedding songs or lullabies)
 incantations.

Each of these genres is further divided into several subgroups. For example, in 1918 F. A. Hästesko published a sub-genre classification for incantations, which was used in SKVR.

The regions covered are as follows:

English translation

A selection of poems is presented in normalised Finnish and in English translation in Finnish Folk Poetry: Epic. An Anthology in Finnish and English, edited and translated by Matti Kuusi, Keith Bosley and Michael Branch (Suomalaisen Kirjallisuuden Seuran toimituksia, 329, Helsinki: Finnish Literature Society, 1977).

References

External links

 SKVR online
 Vol. 1 part 1, part 2, parts 3-4
 Vol. 3 part 1, part 2
 Vol. 6 part 2
 Vol. 7 part 3, part 4
 Vol. 9 parts 1-2 parts 3-4
 Vol. 10 part 1
 Vol. 13 part 1

Scandinavian folklore
Kalevala
Finnish mythology